Osita Henry Chikere (born 3 February 1991) is a Nigerian footballer who plays as a striker.

Career
Chikere was born in Mbaise. He signed a contract for Viking in 2013. He made his debut for the club on 24 August 2013 against Sogndal; they lost the game 1–0. After leaving Viking, he played for Sogndal, Eastern Suburbs, Rivers United and Kano Pillars.

Career statistics

References

1991 births
Living people
Nigerian footballers
Association football forwards
Viking FK players
Eliteserien players
Sogndal Fotball players
Norwegian First Division players
Nigerian expatriate footballers
Expatriate footballers in Norway
Nigerian expatriate sportspeople in Norway
Expatriate association footballers in New Zealand
Eastern Suburbs AFC players
Rivers United F.C. players
Kano Pillars F.C. players
People from Mbaise
Sportspeople from Imo State